Fort Florida is a community located in southwest Volusia County, Florida, United States within the city limits of DeBary.

References

Founded by Entrepreneur George Newman, See George Newman for reference.

Populated places in Volusia County, Florida